Leandro Farias  (born October 18, 1983), sometimes known as just Leandro or Leandrinho  is a football player, currently playing for Esporte Clube Pelotas. Born in Brazil, he played for the Togo national team.

Notes

1983 births
Living people
Brazilian footballers
Brazilian emigrants to Togo
Brazilian expatriate footballers
Association football forwards
FC Sheriff Tiraspol players
Expatriate footballers in Moldova
Avaí FC players
América Futebol Clube (RN) players
Brazilian expatriate sportspeople in Moldova
Grêmio Esportivo Juventus players
Footballers from Porto Alegre